Donald Christopher Cooper (born August 22, 1965) is an American singer.

Career 
Cooper started his career playing in several local bands and touring  local clubs in the Pittsburgh area while studying singing under renowned opera coach Charlotte Coleman. His first thrust into the international spotlight was as a finalist to be Rob Halford's replacement in Judas Priest. Having created a buzz at the auditions, Cooper found himself with offers to sing for many European and American bands. He selected the band Royal Hunt and officially joined the band on December 26, 1994.

After spending four years with Royal Hunt, Cooper was suddenly and unexpectedly fired from the band, which he discovered by reading an announcement on their website. His next project, a solo album that he began in 1998, enlisted the help of musicians from many well known bands (among them guitarist Tore Østby of Conception, and members of Pink Cream 69). He released D. C. Cooper in 1999.

After a successful tour, Cooper formed a new band with former Sinner guitarist Alex Beyrodt called Silent Force. They have released four studio albums of their own. In 2012, Cooper made an announcement saying he was leaving the band and a new line-up was announced in 2013. Cooper was replaced by singer Michael Bormann.

Cooper has recorded guest vocals for Australian progressive metal act Voyager. In 2011 he rejoined Royal Hunt and performed on their Japan and Russian tour. Later the same year it was announced that Cooper would make a new record with the band.

Cooper recorded lead vocals for the Italian band Derdian for their album "Revolution Era".

Personal life 
While not on tour, Cooper can frequently be found volunteering as a firefighter in his home state of Pennsylvania.

Cooper is married to Michelle Cooper and the couple has two sons, born in 2003 and 2005.

Discography

The Tung Bandits 
 The Tung Bandits (album) (1990)

Solo album 
 D. C. Cooper (1999)

Royal Hunt 

 Far Away (EP) (1995)
 Moving Target (1995)
 1996 (1996)
 Paradox (1997)
 Closing the Chapter (1998)
 The Best (1998)
 The Best Live (1998)
 Show Me How To Live (2011)
 A Life to Die For (2013)
 Devil's Dozen (2015)
 Cargo (2016)
 Cast in Stone (2018)
 Dystopia (2020)
 Dystopia II (2022)

Silent Force 
 The Empire of Future (2000)
 Infatuator (2001)
 Worlds Apart (2004)
 Walk the Earth (2007)

Missa Mercuria 
 Missa Mercuria (2002)

Amaran's Plight 
 Voice in the Light (2007)

Guest appearances

References

External links 
D. C. Cooper official site
Amaran's Plight official site

1965 births
Living people
American heavy metal singers
Silent Force members
Royal Hunt members
People from Johnstown, Pennsylvania